Vazhikatti is a 1965 Indian Tamil-language romantic comedy film directed by K. Perumal and written by Nagercoil Padmanabhan. The film stars S. S. Rajendran, Rajasree and C. R. Vijayakumari, with V. K. Ramasamy and M. R. Radha in supporting roles.

Plot 

A domestic servant is forced by his wealthy master to marry his modern daughter to avoid an awkward situation. The girl refuses to treat her former servant as her husband. He then conspires with a nurse and feigns to make love to her to create jealousy in his wife. It works and finally the husband and wife rejoin happily.

Cast 
 S. S. Rajendran as the servant
 Rajasree as the servant's wife
 C. R. Vijayakumari as the nurse
 V. K. Ramasamy
 M. R. Radha

Soundtrack 
The music was composed by Ibrahim.

Release and reception 
Vazhikatti was released in 1965 after being in deadlock for nearly three years. T. M. Ramachandran of Sport and Pastime said the film's release "in an unostentatious manner raised some doubts as to its quality. But all the misgivings have vanished into thin air and it has turned out to be above average". He praised the performances of the lead trio, along with Padmanabhan's writing, Ibrahim's music and Perumal's direction. The Indian Express wrote, "A bane of the Tamil cinema is exaggeration – in characterisation and incidents. It has spoiled or considerably lessened the effect of many a good theme. The latest victim is Kanaka Movies' Vazhikatti." Kalki called the story outdated and predictable, but said it could be watched once for Rajendran.

References

External links 
 

1960s Tamil-language films
1965 films
1965 romantic comedy films
Indian romantic comedy films